Cordiereae is a tribe of flowering plants in the family Rubiaceae and contains 124 species in 12 genera. Its representatives are found in central and southern tropical America.

Genera 
Currently accepted names

 Agouticarpa C.H.Perss. (7 sp)
 Alibertia A.Rich. ex DC. (25 sp)
 Amaioua Aubl. (9 sp)
 Botryarrhena Ducke (2 sp)
 Cordiera A.Rich. ex DC. (11 sp)
 Duroia L.f. (38 sp)
 Glossostipula Lorence (3 sp)
 Kutchubaea Fisch. ex DC. (13 sp)
 Melanopsidium Colla (1 sp)
 Riodocea Delprete (1 sp)
 Stachyarrhena Hook.f. (13 sp)
 Stenosepala C.H.Perss. (1 sp)

Synonyms

Borojoa Cuatrec. = Alibertia
Coupoui Aubl. = Duroia
Cupirana Miers = Duroia
Cupuia Raf. = Duroia
Ehrenbergia Spreng. = Amaioua
Einsteinia Ducke = Kutchubaea
Garapatica H.Karst. = Alibertia
Gardeniola Cham. = Alibertia
Genipella A.Rich. ex DC. = Alibertia
Hexactina Willd. ex Schult. & Schult.f. = Amaioua
Ibetralia Bremek. = Kutchubaea
Kotchubaea Regel ex Benth. = Kutchubaea
Pubeta L. = Duroia
Scepseothamnus Cham. = Alibertia
Schachtia H.Karst. = Duroia
Thieleodoxa Cham. = Alibertia

References 

Ixoroideae tribes